Wellsburg Historic District is a national historic district located at Wellsburg, Brooke County, West Virginia. It encompasses 693 contributing buildings in the central business district and surrounding residential areas of Wellsburg.  Notable buildings include the Brooke County Courthouse (1836), Northwestern Bank of Virginia (1835), Christ Episcopal Church (1887), First Methodist Church (1853), Patrick Gass Cottage (1797, c. 1850), and Crescent Glass factory (c. 1900). Also in the district are a number of residences in popular architectural styles including Greek Revival and Late Victorian. Located within the district are the separately listed Miller's Tavern and Wellsburg Wharf.

It was listed on the National Register of Historic Places in 1982.

References

National Register of Historic Places in Brooke County, West Virginia
Historic districts in Brooke County, West Virginia
Federal architecture in West Virginia
Greek Revival architecture in West Virginia
Victorian architecture in West Virginia
Houses in Brooke County, West Virginia
Houses on the National Register of Historic Places in West Virginia
Commercial buildings on the National Register of Historic Places in West Virginia
Historic districts on the National Register of Historic Places in West Virginia